Chrysothamnus scopulorum, called Grand Canyon glowweed or evening-daisy , is a North American species of flowering plants in the tribe Astereae within the family Asteraceae. It has been found only in northern Arizona and southern Utah.

Chrysothamnus scopulorum is a branching shrub up to 100 cm (40 inches) tall with tan or gray bark, becoming flaky as it gets old. It has many small, yellow flower heads clumped into dense arrays. The species grows on mountain slopes alongside brush and Ponderosa pine.

References

External links
photo of herbarium specimen at Missouri Botanical Garden, collected in Utah, type specimen of Bigelowia menziesii var. scopulorum/Chrysothamnus scopulorum

Astereae
Flora of Arizona
Flora of Utah
Flora of the Colorado Plateau and Canyonlands region
Endemic flora of the United States
Plants described in 1895
Flora without expected TNC conservation status